In fluid dynamics, wave setup is the increase in mean water level due to the presence of breaking waves. Similarly, wave setdown is a wave-induced decrease of the mean water level before the waves break (during the shoaling process). For short, the whole phenomenon is often denoted as wave setup, including both increase and decrease of mean elevation. This setup is primarily present in and near the coastal surf zone. Besides a spatial variation in the (mean) wave setup, also a variation in time may be present – known as surf beat – causing infragravity wave radiation.

Wave setup can be mathematically modeled by considering the variation in radiation stress . Radiation stress is the tensor of excess horizontal-momentum fluxes due to the presence of the waves.

In and near the coastal surf zone
As a progressive wave approaches shore and the water depth decreases, the wave height increases due to wave shoaling. As a result, there is additional wave-induced flux of horizontal momentum. The horizontal momentum equations of the mean flow requires this additional wave-induced flux to be balanced: this causes a decrease in the mean water level before the waves break, called a "setdown". 

After the waves break, the wave energy flux is no longer constant, but decreasing due to energy dissipation. The radiation stress therefore decreases after the break point, causing a free surface level increase to balance: wave setup. Both of the above descriptions are specifically for beaches with mild bed slope.

Wave setup is particularly of concern during storm events, when the effects of big waves generated by wind from the storm are able to increase the mean sea level (by wave setup), enhancing the risks of damage to coastal infrastructure.

See also
Coastal flooding

References

Physical oceanography
Water waves